Gillam Water Aerodrome  is located  east of Gillam, Manitoba, Canada.

See also
Gillam Airport

References

Registered aerodromes in Manitoba
Seaplane bases in Manitoba